Al Marzooqi  Is a family that belongs to the Ajman (tribe) Which descended from Banu Yam that came from Najran in the Arabian Peninsula.

See also

Kookherd
Bastak
Bandar Lengeh
Morbagh
Maghoh
Huwala

References

Arab families
Iranian families